Geney is a commune in the Doubs department in the Bourgogne-Franche-Comté region in eastern France.

The Abbey of Lieu-Croissant was located here.

Population

Inhabitants of Geney are called Geneys.

See also 
 Abbey of Lieu-Croissant
 Communes of the Doubs department

References

Communes of Doubs